The 1945 NCAA Track and Field Championships were contested at the 24th annual NCAA-hosted track meet to determine the team and individual national champions of men's collegiate track and field events in the United States. For the second straight year, this meet events were hosted by Marquette University at Marquette Stadium in Milwaukee, Wisconsin.

Navy captured the team championship, their first title.

Team Result
Note: Top 10 finishers only
 (H) = Hosts

See also
 NCAA Men's Outdoor Track and Field Championship
 1945 NCAA Men's Cross Country Championships

References

NCAA Men's Outdoor Track and Field Championship
1945 in sports in Wisconsin
NCAA